The Collection is a compilation album by German heavy metal band Accept, released in 1991. The songs on the album were pulled from Accept's albums Accept, I'm a Rebel, Breaker, Restless and Wild, Balls to the Wall, Metal Heart, and Russian Roulette. It omits anything from Eat the Heat, which was released two years before this compilation album.

Track listing

Personnel
 Udo Dirkschneider – lead vocals (tracks 1–17)
 Wolf Hoffmann – guitar (all tracks)
 Jörg Fischer – guitar (tracks 1–6, 13–18)
 Peter Baltes – bass guitar (all tracks), lead vocals (track 18)
 Stefan Kaufmann – drums (tracks 2–18)
 Herman Frank – guitar (tracks 7–12)
 Frank Friedrich – drums (track 1)

References

External links
The Collection at Last.fm

1991 greatest hits albums
Accept (band) albums